Huawei VR Glass is a brand of virtual reality headsets by Huawei. It consists of the Huawei VR Glass and the upcoming Huawei VR Glass 6DoF.

Huawei
Virtual reality headsets